Matt Seamark (born ) is a Wales international rugby league footballer. He represented Wales in the 2011 Four Nations.

Background
Seamark was born in Townsville, Queensland, Australia.

Playing career
He plays for the Wynnum Manly Seagulls in the Queensland Cup. The Seagulls won the Cup in 2011.

Seamark qualified for the Welsh team due to a Welsh grandma and was called up for the 2011 Four Nations. He made his test début against Ireland on 22 October 2011.

References

External links
(archived by web.archive.org) Statistics at rlwc2017.com

1987 births
Living people
Australian people of Welsh descent
Australian rugby league players
Rugby league halfbacks
Rugby league players from Townsville
Wales national rugby league team players
Wynnum Manly Seagulls players